A fecalith is a stone made of feces. It is a hardening of feces into lumps of varying size and may occur anywhere in the intestinal tract but is typically found in the colon. It is also called appendicolith when it occurs in the appendix and is sometimes concomitant with appendicitis. They can also obstruct diverticula. It can possibly form secondary to fecal impaction. A fecaloma is a more severe form of fecal impaction, and a hardened fecaloma may be considered to be a giant fecalith. The term is from Greek líthos=stone.

Diagnosis 

 CT Scan
 Projectional radiography
 Ultrasound

Complications 

A small fecalith is one cause of both appendicitis and acute diverticulitis.

See also 

 Bezoar
 Fecal impaction, including fecaloma
 Coprolith is also used to mean geologically fossilized feces.

References

External links 

Diseases of appendix
Feces